unu was a Romanian art magazine published from 1928 to 1935.

UNU or Unu may also refer to:

 United Nations University, the academic and research arm of the United Nations, established in 1973 and based in Tokyo, Japan
 University of Nottingham Students' Union, formerly called University of Nottingham Union
 Unnilunium (Unu), the IUPAC systematic name for chemical element 101, Mendelevium (symbol: Md)
 Unu River, Romania
 Unu (Star Wars), a fictional race in the Star Wars universe
 unu, a command-line utility for managing files in the nrrd format
 Oenoë (alternate spelling Unu), an Indonesian principality in Aceh
 UNU social platform
Unu (company), a German manufacturer of electric scooters based in Berlin

See also
 U Nu (1907–1995), Prime Minister of Burma